The Gogol River is a river in Madang Province, Papua New Guinea.

See also
North Gogol River languages
South Gogol River languages

External links 
 Photo of the river

Rivers of Papua New Guinea
Madang Province